The Cook Islands national cricket team is the team that represents the Cook Islands - an island country in a free association with New Zealand - in international cricket matches. The team is organised by the Cook Islands Cricket Association, which became an affiliate member of the International Cricket Council (ICC) in 2000 and an associate member when all affiliate members were promoted to that status in 2017.

The Cook Islands' first international tournament was the 2001 edition of the Pacifica Cup, which was played in New Zealand. The team has played at ICC East Asia-Pacific tournaments, and at the 2006 EAP Trophy finished second to Fiji and narrowly missed out on qualifying for the World Cricket League. Outside ICC tournaments, the Cook Islands fielded a team in the cricket tournament at the 2003 South Pacific Games, winning the bronze medal.

In April 2018, the ICC decided to grant full Twenty20 International (T20I) status to all its members. Therefore, all Twenty20 matches played between the Cook Islands and other ICC members since 1 January 2019 have been full T20Is.

Cook Islands was scheduled to return to international competition at the 2019 Pacific Games in Samoa, but choose to not participate and instead concentrate on development of the National Team.

In September 2022 they played the Tāmaki Makaurau Tāne, an all-Māori squad, in Auckland, New Zealand, before participating in the T-20 Cricket World Cup East Asia Pacific Sub-Regional Qualifying Tournament in Vanuatu. They came third in the qualifiers. Following the competition they were ranked by the ICC for the first time, at 55th of 82 teams.

Current squad
Team selected for the T-20 Cricket World Cup East Asia Pacific Sub-Regional Qualifying Tournament in Vanuatu:
 Hori Miller (vice-captain)
 Benjamin George Vakatini
 Davis Teinaki
 Tomakanute Ritawa
 Tomasi Wellington Vanuarua
 Gabe Steven Raymond
 Ma'ara Ave (captain)
 Cory Russell Dickson
 Hayden Bob Dickson
 Liam George Roderick Denny
 William Teariki-Apainga Kokaua
 Thomas Tereapii Nikau Parima
 Aue Metua Parima
 Danny Brent Simpson
 Pare Rongokea (non-travelling reserve)
 Christopher Mana (non-travelling reserve)
 Pati Ataela (non-travelling reserve)

Records 
International Match Summary — Cook Islands
 
Last updated 15 September 2022

Twenty20 International 
T20I record versus other nations

Records complete to T20I #1775. Last updated 15 September 2022.

Other records
For a list of selected international matches played by Cook Islands, see Cricket Archive.

See also
 Cricket in the Cook Islands
 List of Cook Islands Twenty20 International cricketers
 Cook Islands women's national cricket team

References 

National cricket teams
Cricket
Cook Islands in international cricket